The Provincial Court of Alberta is the Provincial Court for the Canadian province of Alberta. The Court oversees matters relating to criminal law, family law, youth law, civil law and traffic law.
The current Provincial Court is the first point of contact between the justice system and an individual in Alberta. More than 170,000 matters come before the Provincial Court of Alberta every year.

Effective April 1, 2023, Alberta’s provincial court will be called the Alberta Court of Justice.

Structure
Although Alberta’s provincial court system has been in operation for more than a century, the Provincial Court of Alberta as it exists today was established in 1978 by the Provincial Court Act. 
This legislation combined the previous Magistrates Court, the Juvenile Court, the Small Claims Court, and the Family Court into one institution. 
The court is led by the Chief Judge of the Provincial Court, who is appointed by the provincial government to serve a seven-year term. There are more than 130 full-time Judges in the Provincial Court of Alberta, working out of more than 70 locations across the province. 
The Provincial Court of Alberta is the court of first instance in Alberta which means decisions from the Provincial Court can be appealed at the Court of King's Bench of Alberta and/or the Court of Appeal of Alberta. 
The Provincial Court hears the majority of criminal and civil cases in Alberta. All of Alberta’s criminal cases start in Provincial Court, and 95 per cent conclude there. Many traffic, regulatory and bylaw enforcement hearings take place at the Provincial Court of Alberta. Most civil cases also take place in Provincial Court, including cases involving landlord and tenant and claims involving less than $50,000. A majority of family law cases and child protection cases are also heard by the Provincial Court.

Traffic Court
The Provincial Court of Alberta’s traffic division deals with offences pursuant to many provincial statutes and regulations, municipal bylaws and a few specified federal statutes. In spite of its name, Traffic Court is not limited to only hearing traffic related offences.
Trials in Traffic Court, whether involving an adult or a young person, are usually heard by a Justice of the Peace. However in some situations or locations trials are heard by a Judge of the Provincial Court.

Family Court
Judges in the Provincial Court of Alberta’s family division hear applications for child and spousal support, parenting arrangements, private guardianship and all child protection cases.  The Provincial Court does not have jurisdiction to decide divorce applications or claims with respect to property rights arising from a breakdown of a relationship, and these matters consequently go to the Court of King’s Bench.

Civil Court
The Civil Division of Provincial Court provides a means to resolve private disputes, including landlord and tenant matters. The maximum amount that may be claimed in the Provincial Court of Alberta’s civil division is $50,000. If the claims exceed $50,000 or involve matters that cannot be heard in Provincial Court, the claim must be filed in the Court of King’s Bench.

Criminal Court
All criminal court appearances start in Provincial Court. The Provincial Court Criminal Division handles first appearances, entry of pleas, bail hearings, preliminary inquiries, trials and sentencing of all prosecutions where the Crown proceeded by summary conviction and the majority of those where the proceedings were by indictment.

See also
 Alberta Court of King's Bench
 Alberta Court of Appeal

References

External links
 Provincial Court of Alberta

Alberta courts
Alberta
Buildings and structures in Edmonton